Humenné  is a town in the Prešov Region ("kraj") in eastern Slovakia and the second largest town of the historic Zemplín region. It lies at the volcanic Vihorlat mountains and at the confluence of the Laborec and Cirocha Rivers.

Names and etymology
The name comes from a common Slavic word "humno" (gumьno). In Slovak "backyard", the exact meaning may differ in dialects. Initially, a female adjective (1322 Homonna, 1332 Humenna, 1381 Humenna, 1391 Humonna) then neutrum Humenné.

Landmarks
Humenné is a center of one of the easternmost districts ("okres") in Slovakia. The most attractive places are the Vihorlat Mountains boasting of their Morské oko lake, and the Bukovské vrchy (section of the Bieszczady Mountains) at the border of Slovakia, Poland, and Ukraine, which are part of the Poloniny National Park. Humenné is surrounded by ruins of medieval castles and an open-air museum of architecture situated in the town park.

Castles and mansions near Humenné:

 Brekov Castle (in ruins,  to the southwest)
 Jasenov Castle (in ruins,  to the south)
 Čičava Castle (in ruins,  to the southwest )
 Kamenica nad Cirochou: Classicistic mansion from 1773 (at the moment closed for public,  to the east)

History

The Laborec river and the Carpathian mountains predetermined the development of the town and its surroundings, a silent witness of which has been Vihorlat volcano, at  the highest peak of the Vihorlat mountains. Thanks to its advantageous location and pleasant climate, preconditioned by the neighboring mountains, the town has been an attractive place for people since the Stone Age, which is evidenced by a number of archeological findings. The Slavic forefathers of the Slovaks gradually moved to the basin of Humenné during the great migration of peoples, starting in the 5th century.

An intensive and organized settlement of this area started as late as in the middle of the 13th century, after the Mongol raids. The first written document mentioning Humenné dates back to 1317. The history of Humenné is closely connected with the Drugeth (Drugets, Drugetovci), a distinguished aristocratic family originally from Naples, who, accompanying the king Charles Robert of Anjou, came to the Kingdom of Hungary (the territory of present-day Slovakia was part of the Kingdom of Hungary) at the beginning of the 14th century. The Drugeths made Humenné their seat and changed it into the centre of one of the largest feudal dominions in Upper-Hungary. King Matthias Corvinus conferred civic privileges (town status) on the town, which were validated by a seal with coat of arms. At that time, the town was crossed by an important trade route connecting the Kingdom of Hungary with the Kingdom of Poland. Humenné is mentioned among royal customs offices, and later on it received the right of storehousing and supposedly market rights, too. This was also the time of an ever-increasing influence of shepherd colonization from Transcarpathia by the so-called Walachians (Ruthenes, Poles, and Romanians).

The most significant town monument, a Renaissance castle, was built on the place of an original stone castle in about 1610. The castle came to be an indispensable characteristic feature of the town and serves for museum and cultural purposes at present.

In 1613, during the Counter Reformation, a Jesuit college was established as the first secondary school in the history of Humenné.

In 1619, about 10,000 Polish riders—a lisowczycy—led by Walenty Rogawski, defeated army of George I Rákóczi in Battle of Humenné. Rákóczi was insurgent against Habsburgs and ally of Gábor Bethlen, Duke of Transylvania.

The Drugeth line died out in 1684 and new feudal lords moved in, notably the Csákys and the Wandernats.

The abolition of some feudal duties and the reforms of Maria Theresa promoted the development of crafts, and Humenné became the seat of the so-called "salt office". The town's population consisted of Slovaks, Ruthenes, Hungarians and Jews. Latin was used as the administrative language, which appeared to be a stabilizing factor in such a mixture of nationalities.

The Andrássy family from Transylvania started to influence the history of Humenné in the 19th century, a period characterized by economic growth. Moreover, many new buildings were erected at that time. The main fields of activities of town inhabitants were agriculture, crafts and trade. The first train appeared in Humenné in 1871, stimulating the development of trade and wood cutting. In 1899 the first business academy in Austria-Hungary was established in Humenné. Toward the end of the 19th century, Humenné counted 4,000 inhabitants.

The 20th century brought along a cultural revival. Humenné was famous for its markets and fairs. This promising, though timid, development was interrupted by World War I. A short period of the existence of Czechoslovakia between the two world wars proved to have positive effects upon the life of Humenné. As a corollary of World War II, however, all the effort had to start from the very beginning. On 26 November 1944, Humenné was captured by troops of the Soviet 18th Army, acting as a part of the 4th Ukrainian Front, after which the town became again part of Czechoslovakia.

Until 1956 Humenné was an administrative rather than an economic centre. Then the construction of a plant for the production of textile polyamide fibres, the present Chemlon company, triggered a real chain effect on the town's growth. Humenné was gradually becoming a centre of chemical, building, food and mechanical engineering industries. This had a positive impact on the development of technical colleges. The industrial development entailed large-scale housing projects, and the town area was completed by new housing estates. While there were 7,000 inhabitants living in Humenné in 1948, the population now amounts over 33,000.

Demographics
According to the 2012 census, the town had 34,634 inhabitants. However, along with the surrounding villages that make up the town-ring, Humenné has some 42 thousand inhabitants. 79% of inhabitants were Slovaks, 6.5% Rusyns, 2.33% Roma, 1.16% Ukrainian and 0.49% Czechs. The religious makeup was 57.91% Roman Catholics, 23.00% Greek Catholics, 8.69% people with no religious affiliation, 5.91% Orthodox and 0.98% Lutherans.

In 1910, 48.6% were Roman Catholic, 34.8% Jewish, 12.3% Greek Catholic, while 38.2% reported Hungarian as their primary language, 30.8% Slovak and 21.1% Yiddish or German.

Sports

Football
Humenné had one club with top flight history: FC Chemlon Humenné, winning Slovak Cup in 1996. FC Chemlon also played UEFA Cup Winners' Cup in the 1996–97 season. The club had a more turbulent time during its name changes as; HFC Humenné, 1. HFC Humenné and ŠK Futura Humenné and could not replicate its success as Chemlon. In August 2015, the licence of ŠK Futura was bought by FK Drustav Svidník, but the Slovak Football Association rules do not allow to change club names only a few days before the start of the season. The Svidník club also announced a merger between FK Drustav and ŠK Futura within one year with a new name.

FK Humenné is the second club in Humenné, established in 2003, playing home matches at the Ihrisko pri Mlyne Stadium, they currently play in the 4th division.

Volleyball
Humenné had one of the most successful team VK Chemes Humenné in Slovak volleyball but due to dispute between owner and town about finance, club was transferred to another town Spišká Nová Ves. Nowadays no one volleyball club is in Humenné.

Ice hockey
The city's ice hockey club is MHK Humenné, that competes in Slovak 1.Liga (2nd level).

Largest companies in Humenné (2015)
 Andritz Slovakia
 Nexis Fibers
 Reinter

Notable natives and residents

 Yuri Dojc, Artist and Photographer
 Peter Breiner, pianist, conductor, and composer
 Michal Kováč - first Slovak president in the modern era
 Jozef Tomko, cardinal
 István Thomán, Hungarian piano virtuoso and music educator
 Ágoston Trefort, Hungarian politician, who served as Minister of Religion and Education from 1872 until his death. He was the President of the Hungarian Academy of Sciences from 1885
 Ferenc Zichy, bishop
 Joachim Jacob Unger, rabbi
 Štefan Babjak, opera singer
 František Kasanič, professional boxer
 Ladislav Grosman, Oscar prize winner
 Morris Newfield, rabbi
 Marian Čekovský, Artist
 Gabriel A. Levicky, Artist
 David Čelovský, Cyberathlete

Twin towns – sister cities

Humenné is twinned with:

 Darney, France
 Jarosław, Poland
 Mátészalka, Hungary
 Mukachevo, Ukraine
 Perechyn, Ukraine
 Przemyśl, Poland
 Sanok, Poland
 Šibenik, Croatia
 Třebíč, Czech Republic
 Vidnoye, Russia

See also
 The Good Soldier Švejk

References

External links
  
  Page of the town Humenné
  UrbanPark - photo project about Humenné
  Childhood Dream - project about community life in Humenné

 
Castles in Slovakia
Cities and towns in Slovakia
Magdeburg rights
Zemplín (region)
Villages and municipalities in Humenné District